The Institute of Environmental Sciences and Technology (IEST) is a non-profit, technical society where professionals who impact controlled environments connect, gain knowledge, receive advice, and work together to create industry best practices. The organization uniquely serves environmental test engineers, qualification engineers, cleanroom professionals, those who work in product testing and evaluation, and others who work across a variety of industries, including: acoustics, aerospace, automotive, biotechnology/bioscience, climatics, cleanroom operations/design/equipment/certification, dynamics, filtration, food processing, HVAC design, medical devices, nanotechnology, pharmaceutical, semiconductors/microelectronics, and shock/vibration.  Information on ISO 14644 and ISO 14698 standards can be found through this organization.

Founded in 1953, the organization is headquartered in Schaumburg, Illinois. Its members are internationally recognized in the fields of environmental tests; contamination control; product reliability; and aerospace.

International standards
The organization is the Secretariat of ISO/TC 209: cleanroom and associated controlled environments. This committee writes the ISO 14644 standards. IEST is also a founding member of the ANSI-accredited US TAG to ISO/TC 229 - Nanotechnologies.
IEST has also revised such Federal Standards as FED-STD-209, MIL-STD-781, MIL-STD-810, and MIL-STD-1246 (now IEST-STD-1246E).

The IEST also distributes to the public all ISO 14644 and ISO 14698 standards.

Recommended practices
IEST publishes and disseminates up-to-date, reliable, technical information within each of its divisions known as IEST Recommended Practices. These Recommended Practices provide procedures based on peer-approved applications. These documents are then formulated by IEST Working Groups. IEST has also revised such Federal Standards as FED-STD-209E, MIL-STD-781, MIL-STD-810, and MIL-STD-1246 (now IEST-STD-CC1246).

Contamination control recommended practices
 IEST-RP-CC001.6: HEPA and ULPA Filters
 IEST-RP-CC002.4: Unidirectional Flow Clean-Air Devices
 IEST-RP-CC003.4: Garment System Considerations in Cleanrooms and Other Controlled Environments
 IEST-RP-CC004.3: Evaluating Wiping Materials Used in Cleanrooms and Other Controlled Environments
 IEST-RP-CC005.4: Gloves and Finger Cots Used in Cleanrooms and Other Controlled Environments
 IEST-RP-CC006.3: Testing Cleanrooms
 IEST-RP-CC007.3: Testing ULPA Filters
 IEST-RP-CC008.2: High-Efficiency Gas-phase Adsorber Cells
 IEST-RP-CC011.2: A Glossary of Terms and Definitions Relating to Contamination Control
 IEST-RP-CC012.3: Considerations in Cleanroom Design
 IEST-RP-CC013.3: Calibration Procedures and Guidelines for Selecting Equipment Used in Testing Cleanrooms and Other Controlled Environments
 IEST-RP-CC014.2: Calibration and Characterization of Optical Airborne Particle Counters
 IEST-RP-CC016.2:  The Rate of Deposition of Nonvolatile Residue in Cleanrooms
 IEST-RP-CC018.4: Cleanroom Housekeeping – Operating and Monitoring Procedures
 IEST-RP-CC019.1: Qualifications for Organizations Engaged in the Testing and Certification of Cleanrooms and Clean-Air Devices
 IEST-RP-CC020.2: Substrates and Forms of Documentation in Cleanrooms
 IEST-RP-CC021.4: Testing HEPA and ULPA Filter Media
 IEST-RP-CC022.2: Electrostatic Charge in Cleanrooms and Other Controlled Environments
 IEST-RP-CC023.2: Microorganisms in Cleanrooms
 IEST-RP-CC024.1: Measuring and Reporting Vibration in Microelectronics Facilities
 IEST-RP-CC026.2: Cleanroom Operations
 IEST-RP-CC027.2: Personnel Practices and Procedures in Cleanrooms and Controlled Environments
 IEST-RP-CC028.1: Minienvironments
 IEST-RP-CC029.1: Automotive Paint-Spray Applications
 IEST-RP-CC031.3: Method of Characterizing Outgassed Organic Compounds from Cleanroom Materials and Components
 IEST-RP-CC032.1: Flexible Packaging Materials for Use in Cleanrooms and Other Controlled Environments
 IEST-RP-CC034.4: HEPA and ULPA Filter Leak Testing
 IEST-G-CC035.1:  Design Considerations for AMC Filtration Systems in Cleanrooms
 IEST-CC036.1: Testing Fan Filter Units
 IEST-RP-CC042.1: Sizing and Counting of Submicrometer Liquid-borne Particles Using Optical Discrete-Particle Counters
 IEST-RP-CC044.1: Vacuum Cleaning Systems for Use in Cleanrooms and Other Controlled Environments
 IEST-RP-CC046.1: Controlled Environments (Aerospace, Non-cleanroom)
 IEST-RP-CC049.1: Controlled Environments for Regulated Industries
 IEST-STD-CC1246: Product Cleanliness Levels – Applications, Requirements, and Determination

Nanotechnology recommended practices
IEST-RP-NANO200.1: Planning of Nanoscale Science and Technology Facilities: Guidelines for Design, Construction, and Start-Up
IEST-RP-NANO205.1: Nanotechnology Safety: Application of Prevention Through Design Principles to Nanotechnology Facilities

Design, test, and evaluation recommended practices
 IEST-RP-DTE009.1: Vibration Shaker System Selection
 IEST-RP-DTE011.2: Mechanical Shock and Vibration Transducer Selection
 IEST-RP-DTE012.2: Handbook for Dynamic Data Acquisition and Analysis
 IEST-RP-DTE019.1: Vibration Controller Selection
 IEST-RP-DTE022.1: Multi-shaker Test and Control
 IEST-RP-DTE026.1: Using  MIL-STD-810F, 519 Gunfire
 IEST-RP-DTE032.2: Pyroshock Testing Techniques
 IEST-RP-DTE040.1:; High-Intensity Acoustics Testing
 IEST-RP-DTE046.1:; Terms Commonly Used in the Digital Analysis of Dynamic Data 
 The History and Rationale of MIL-STD-810

Product reliability recommended practices
 IEST-RP-PR001.2: Management and Technical Guidelines for the ESS Process
 IEST-RP-PR003.1: HALT and HASS

Journal of the IEST
The online Journal of the IEST publishes peer-reviewed technical papers, with a per-article fee, and free TechTalk articles related to the fields of contamination control; design, test, and evaluation; and product reliability. The online Journal provides never-before-available access to an entire decade of technical articles and peer-reviewed technical papers on simulation, testing, control, current research, and teaching of environmental sciences and technologies. The Journal of the IEST is the official publication of IEST, the Institute of Environmental Sciences and Technology, of archival quality with continuous publication since 1958.

References

External links

Environmental organizations based in the United States
Cleanroom technology
Environmental testing